Gekkomorpha is an un-ranked taxon of the Gekkota infraorder, containing the two superfamilies Eublepharoidea and Gekkonoidea. Gekkomorpha is a sister group to Pygopodomorpha, an un-ranked taxon containing the superfamily  Pygopodoidea.

References

Geckos